Len Amato is an American race car driver from Bound Brook, New Jersey, who competed in one United States Formula Three Championship race at Watkins Glen International in 2001. He then returned to amateur series until 2009, when he re-emerged in the F2000 Championship Series.

References

Living people
Year of birth missing (living people)
People from Bound Brook, New Jersey
Racing drivers from New Jersey
Sportspeople from Somerset County, New Jersey
United States Formula Three Championship drivers